The 1965 Washington State Cougars baseball team represented the Washington State University in the 1965 NCAA University Division baseball season. The Cougars played their home games at Bailey Field. The team was coached by Chuck Brayton in his 4th year as head coach at Washington State.

The Cougars won the District VIII to advance to the College World Series, where they were defeated by the Ohio State Buckeyes.

Roster

Schedule

|-
! style="" | Regular Season
|-

|-
! bgcolor="#DDDDFF" width="3%" | #
! bgcolor="#DDDDFF" width="7%" | Date
! bgcolor="#DDDDFF" width="14%" | Opponent
! bgcolor="#DDDDFF" width="25%" | Site/Stadium
! bgcolor="#DDDDFF" width="5%" | Score
! bgcolor="#DDDDFF" width="5%" | Overall Record
! bgcolor="#DDDDFF" width="5%" | PCC Record
|- align="center" bgcolor="#ccffcc"
| 1 || March 25 || at  || Harris Field • Lewiston, Idaho || 17–1 || 1–0 || 0–0
|- align="center" bgcolor="#ccffcc"
| 2 || March 26 || vs  || Harris Field • Lewiston, Idaho || 10–0 || 2–0 || 0–0
|- align="center" bgcolor="#ccffcc"
| 3 || March 26 || vs  || Harris Field • Lewiston, Idaho || 3–2 || 3–0 || 0–0
|- align="center" bgcolor="#ccffcc"
| 4 || March 27 || vs  || Harris Field • Lewiston, Idaho || 13–1 || 4–0 || 0–0
|- align="center" bgcolor="#ccffcc"
| 5 || March 27 || vs  || Harris Field • Lewiston, Idaho || 5–3 || 5–0 || 0–0
|-

|-
! bgcolor="#DDDDFF" width="3%" | #
! bgcolor="#DDDDFF" width="7%" | Date
! bgcolor="#DDDDFF" width="14%" | Opponent
! bgcolor="#DDDDFF" width="25%" | Site/Stadium
! bgcolor="#DDDDFF" width="5%" | Score
! bgcolor="#DDDDFF" width="5%" | Overall Record
! bgcolor="#DDDDFF" width="5%" | AAWU Record
|- align="center" bgcolor="#ccffcc"
| 6 || April 2 || at Yakima || Parker Field • Yakima, Washington || 12–4 || 6–0 || 0–0
|- align="center" bgcolor="#ccffcc"
| 7 || April 2 || at Yakima || Parker Field • Pullman, Washington || 6–0 || 7–0 || 0–0
|- align="center" bgcolor="#ccffcc"
| 8 || April 5 || at  || Unknown • Reno, Nevada || 9–4 || 8–0 || 0–0
|- align="center" bgcolor="#ccffcc"
| 9 || April 6 || at Nevada || Unknown • Reno, Nevada || 7–3 || 9–0 || 0–0
|- align="center" bgcolor="#ccffcc"
| 10 || April 10 || at  || John Smith Field • Sacramento, California || 6–5 || 10–0 || 0–0
|- align="center" bgcolor="#ccffcc"
| 11 || April 10 || at Sacramento State || John Smith Field • Sacramento, California || 5–0 || 11–0 || 0–0
|- align="center" bgcolor="#ccffcc"
| 12 || April 13 || at  || Mulligan Field • Spokane, Washington || 7–1 || 12–0 || 0–0
|- align="center" bgcolor="#ffcccc"
| 13 || April 13 || at Gonzaga || Mulligan Field • Spokane, Washington || 0–1 || 12–1 || 0–0
|- align="center" bgcolor="#ccffcc"
| 14 || April 16 ||  || Bailey Field • Pullman, Washington || 7–0 || 13–1 || 1–0
|- align="center" bgcolor="#ccffcc"
| 15 || April 17 || Washington || Bailey Field • Pullman, Washington || 5–0 || 14–1 || 2–0
|- align="center" bgcolor="#ccffcc"
| 16 || April 17 || Washington || Bailey Field • Pullman, Washington || 4–3 || 15–1 || 3–0
|- align="center" bgcolor="#ccffcc"
| 17 || April 21 || at  || MacLean Field • Moscow, Idaho || 5–0 || 16–1 || 3–0
|- align="center" bgcolor="#ffcccc"
| 18 || April 23 ||  || Bailey Field • Pullman, Washington || 4–5 || 16–2 || 3–1
|- align="center" bgcolor="#ccffcc"
| 19 || April 24 || Oregon State || Bailey Field • Pullman, Washington || 3–0 || 17–2 || 4–1
|- align="center" bgcolor="#ccffcc"
| 20 || April 24 || Oregon State || Bailey Field • Pullman, Washington || 3–2 || 18–2 || 5–1
|- align="center" bgcolor="#ccffcc"
| 21 || April 27 || Oregon State || Bailey Field • Pullman, Washington || 16–1 || 19–2 || 5–1
|- align="center" bgcolor="#ffcccc"
| 22 || April 30 || at  || Howe Field • Eugene, Oregon || 1–5 || 19–3 || 5–2
|-

|-
! bgcolor="#DDDDFF" width="3%" | #
! bgcolor="#DDDDFF" width="7%" | Date
! bgcolor="#DDDDFF" width="14%" | Opponent
! bgcolor="#DDDDFF" width="25%" | Site/Stadium
! bgcolor="#DDDDFF" width="5%" | Score
! bgcolor="#DDDDFF" width="5%" | Overall Record
! bgcolor="#DDDDFF" width="5%" | AAWU Record
|- align="center" bgcolor="#ccffcc"
| 23 || May 1 || at Oregon || Howe Field • Eugene, Oregon || 8–7 || 20–3 || 6–2
|- align="center" bgcolor="#ccffcc"
| 24 || May 1 || at Oregon || Howe Field • Eugene, Oregon || 8–2 || 21–3 || 7–2
|- align="center" bgcolor="#ffcccc"
| 25 || May 5 || Idaho || Bailey Field • Pullman, Washington || 1–3 || 21–4 || 7–2
|- align="center" bgcolor="#ccffcc"
| 26 || May 7 || at Oregon State || Coleman Field • Corvallis, Oregon || 8–6 || 22–4 || 8–2
|- align="center" bgcolor="#ccffcc"
| 27 || May 8 || at Oregon State || Coleman Field • Corvallis, Oregon || 9–2 || 23–4 || 9–2
|- align="center" bgcolor="#ccffcc"
| 28 || May 8 || at Oregon State || Coleman Field • Corvallis, Oregon || 9–1 || 24–4 || 10–2
|- align="center" bgcolor="#ccffcc"
| 29 || May 12 || Idaho || MacLean Field • Moscow, Idaho || 7–5 || 25–4 || 10–2
|- align="center" bgcolor="#ccffcc"
| 30 || May 14 || Oregon || Bailey Field • Pullman, Washington || 2–0 || 26–4 || 11–2
|- align="center" bgcolor="#ccffcc"
| 31 || May 15 || Oregon || Bailey Field • Pullman, Washington || 5–4 || 27–4 || 12–2
|- align="center" bgcolor="#ffcccc"
| 32 || May 15 || Oregon || Bailey Field • Pullman, Washington || 11–12 || 27–5 || 12–3
|- align="center" bgcolor="#ccffcc"
| 33 || May 21 || at Washington || Graves Field • Seattle, Washington || 2–1 || 28–5 || 13–3
|- align="center" bgcolor="#ccffcc"
| 34 || May 22 || at Washington || Graves Field • Seattle, Washington || 2–1 || 29–5 || 14–3
|- align="center" bgcolor="#ffcccc"
| 35 || May 22 || at Washington || Graves Field • Seattle, Washington || 2–3 || 29–6 || 14–4
|-

|-
! style="" | Postseason
|-

|-
! bgcolor="#DDDDFF" width="3%" | #
! bgcolor="#DDDDFF" width="7%" | Date
! bgcolor="#DDDDFF" width="14%" | Opponent
! bgcolor="#DDDDFF" width="25%" | Site/Stadium
! bgcolor="#DDDDFF" width="5%" | Score
! bgcolor="#DDDDFF" width="5%" | Overall Record
! bgcolor="#DDDDFF" width="5%" | AAWU Record
|- align="center" bgcolor="#ccffcc"
| 36 || May 29 || vs  || Bailey Field • Pullman, Washington || 2–1 || 30–6 || 14–4
|- align="center" bgcolor="#ccffcc"
| 37 || May 30 || vs Stanford || Bailey Field • Pullman, Washington || 13–3 || 31–6 || 14–4
|-

|-
! bgcolor="#DDDDFF" width="3%" | #
! bgcolor="#DDDDFF" width="7%" | Date
! bgcolor="#DDDDFF" width="14%" | Opponent
! bgcolor="#DDDDFF" width="25%" | Site/Stadium
! bgcolor="#DDDDFF" width="5%" | Score
! bgcolor="#DDDDFF" width="5%" | Overall Record
! bgcolor="#DDDDFF" width="5%" | AAWU Record
|- align="center" bgcolor="#ccffcc"
| 38 || June 7 || vs Texas || Johnny Rosenblatt Stadium • Omaha, Nebraska || 12–5 || 32–6 || 14–4
|- align="center" bgcolor="#ffcccc"
| 39 || June 8 || vs Ohio State || Johnny Rosenblatt Stadium • Omaha, Nebraska || 1–14 || 32–7 || 14–4
|- align="center" bgcolor="#ccffcc"
| 40 || June 9 || vs Connecticut || Johnny Rosenblatt Stadium • Omaha, Nebraska || 3–2 || 33–7 || 14–4
|- align="center" bgcolor="#ffcccc"
| 41 || June 10 || vs Ohio State || Johnny Rosenblatt Stadium • Omaha, Nebraska || 0–1 || 33–8 || 14–4
|-

|-
|

Awards and honors 
Danny Frisella
First Team All-District VIII
First Team All-Athletic Association of Western Universities

Bob Fry
First Team All-Athletic Association of Western Universities

John Olerud
First Team All-American
First Team All-District VIII

Gary Strom
First Team All-Athletic Association of Western Universities

References

Washington State Cougars baseball seasons
Washington State Cougars baseball
College World Series seasons
Washington State
Pac-12 Conference baseball champion seasons